Tulbaghia (wild garlic or society garlic) is a genus of monocotyledonous herbaceous perennial bulbs native to Africa, belonging to the  amaryllis family. It is one of only two known genera in the society garlic tribe within the onion subfamily.
The genus was named for Ryk Tulbagh (1699–1771), one time governor of The Cape of Good Hope.

Most species are native to the Eastern Cape Province of South Africa. As is common to many members of the Allioideae, when their leaves are bruised they produce a distinct garlic smell, hence its common name. The flowers are borne in an umbel. Each flower has six narrow tepals. A characteristic of the genus is that there is a "corona" – a raised crown-like structure – at the centre of the flower. This may be small and scale-like or may be larger, somewhat like the trumpet of a small narcissus.

Species

 Tulbaghia acutiloba Harv. – Botswana, Lesotho, Eswatini, South Africa 
 Tulbaghia aequinoctialis Welw. ex Baker – Angola
 Tulbaghia alliacea L.f., syn. Tulbaghia affinis – Botswana, Zimbabwe, Zambia, South Africa 
 Tulbaghia calcarea Engl. & Krause – Namibia
 Tulbaghia cameronii Baker – Cameroon, Zaire, Tanzania, Malawi, Mozambique, Zambia, Zimbabwe, Namibia 
 Tulbaghia capensis L. – Cape Province 
 Tulbaghia cernua Fisch. – Botswana, Lesotho, South Africa 
 Tulbaghia coddii Vosa & R.B.Burb. – Mpumalanga
 Tulbaghia cominsii Vosa – Cape Province 
 Tulbaghia dregeana Kunth – Cape Province 
 Tulbaghia friesii Suess. – Nyanga Mountains of Mozambique + Zimbabwe
 Tulbaghia galpinii Schltr. – Cape Province 
 Tulbaghia leucantha Baker – Botswana, Lesotho, Eswatini, South Africa, Zambia, Zimbabwe, Namibia 
 Tulbaghia ludwigiana Harv. – Eswatini, South Africa
 Tulbaghia luebbertiana Engl. & Krause – Namibia
 Tulbaghia macrocarpa Vosa – Zimbabwe
 Tulbaghia montana Vosa – Cape Province 
 Tulbaghia natalensis Baker – Cape Province, KwaZulu-Natal
 Tulbaghia nutans Vosa – Mpumalanga
 Tulbaghia pretoriensis Vosa & Condy – Gauteng
 Tulbaghia rhodesica R.E.Fr. – Tanzania, Zambia
 Tulbaghia simmleri Beauverd – Northern Province
 Tulbaghia tenuior K.Krause & Dinter – Cape Province, Namibia
 Tulbaghia transvaalensis Vosa – Limpopo, KwaZulu-Natal
 Tulbaghia verdoornia Vosa & R.B.Burb. – Cape Province
 Tulbaghia violacea Harv.  – Society garlic – Cape Province, KwaZulu-Natal; naturalized in Tanzania + Mexico

formerly included
A few names have been coined using the name Tulbaghia, but applied to species now considered better suited to the genus Agapanthus. 
 Tulbaghia africana – Agapanthus africanus 
 Tulbaghia heisteri – Agapanthus africanus 
 Tulbaghia minor – Agapanthus africanus 
 Tulbaghia praecox – Agapanthus praecox

References

Amaryllidaceae genera
Flora of Africa
Allioideae